Aleksei Yevgenyevich Gladyshev (born 8 December 1992) is a Russian football player. He plays for FC Novosibirsk.

Club career
He made his debut in the Russian Second Division for FC Sibir-2 Novosibirsk on 23 April 2011 in a game against FC KUZBASS Kemerovo.

He made his Russian Football National League debut for FC Sibir Novosibirsk on 13 August 2012 in a game against FC Baltika Kaliningrad.

References

1992 births
Sportspeople from Novosibirsk
Living people
Russian footballers
Association football defenders
FC Sibir Novosibirsk players
FC Fakel Voronezh players